Drogenbos is a municipality located in the Belgian province of Flemish Brabant. The municipality only comprises the town of Drogenbos proper. On January 1, 2018, Drogenbos had a total population of 5,599. The total area is 2.49 km² (0.96 sq mi) which gives a population density of 2,248 inhabitants per km² (5,701/sq mi).

The official language of Drogenbos is Dutch, as everywhere in Flanders. Local French-speakers (77% of the population) enjoy linguistic facilities.

Famous inhabitants
 Joseph Loeckx, comic artist, pseudonym Jo-El Azara
 Charles Theodore, Elector of Bavaria, Duke of Bavaria
 Felix De Boeck (1898 - 1995), painter. A museum  has been opened in 1995 with the work of Felix De Boeck.

References

External links

Official website – information available in Dutch and French

 
Municipalities of Flemish Brabant